Mor Bulis (born 18 April 1996) is an Israeli tennis player.

Bulis has a career-high ATP singles ranking of 516 achieved on 7 May 2018. He also has a career-high ATP doubles ranking of 654 achieved on 25 September 2017.

Bulis was born in Petach Tikva, Israel. He plays for the Israel Davis Cup team at the Davis Cup, where he has a W/L record of 1–1.

References

External links

1996 births
Living people
Israeli male tennis players
Sportspeople from Petah Tikva